Sidabrinė gervė 2008 was 1st film award ceremony of Sidabrinė gervė (Silver Crane). The ceremony was held in Vilnius on 29 May 2008.

Commission 
In commission which selected winners was 11 members.
Regimantas Adomaitis
Arūnas Matelis
Živilė Pipinytė
Algirdas Martinaitis
Romualdas Federavičius
Skirmantas Valiulis
Algirdas Selenis
Gražina Baikštytė
Artūras Jevdokimovas
Greta Zabukaitė
Gražina Arlickaitė

Winners and nominees

Best film 
Kolekcionierė (by Kristina Buožytė)
Nuodėmės užkalbėjimas (by Algimantas Puipa)
Nereikalingi žmonės (by Maris Martinsons) Best short film Nerutina (by Jūratė Samulionytė)Perlas (by Laimantas Kairys)
Mano tėvas (by Marius Ivaškevičius)

 Best documentary film 
Gyvenimo senelis ir bobutė (by Giedrė Beinoriūtė)Varpas (by Audrius Stonys)Ispanų suaugusiems (by Tomas Tamošaitis)

 Best animated film 
Edeno sodai (by Nijolė Valadkevičiūtė)Margučių rytas (by Jūratė Leikaitė) Best TV film Nekviesta meilė (by Alvydas Šlepikas)XX am. slaptieji archyvai (by Gražina Sviderskytė)
Garbės kuopa (by Raimundas Banionis)

 Best operator Audrius Kemežys („Varpas“, „Kai aš buvau partizanas“, „Perlas“, „Arklio metai“)Algimantas Mikutėnas („Nuodėmės užkalbėjimas“, „Kad mano namai būtų pilni“, „Šokanti ant stogų“)
Gints Berzinš ("Nereikalingi žmonės")

 Best cinematographer 
Nijolė Valadkevičiūtė (“Edeno sodai”)Galius Kličius (“Nuodėmės užkalbėjimas”)Paulius Arlauskas (“Kolekcionierė”)

 Best scenario 
Marius Ivaškevičius (“Mano tėvas”)
Kristina Buožytė, Darius Gylys, Bruno Samper (“Kolekcionierė”)Alvydas Šlepikas ("Nekviesta meilė") Best director Audrius StonysKristina Buožytė
Algimantas Puipa

 Best supporting actor female 
Rūta Staliliūnaitė ("Kai aš buvau partizanas")Dalia Michelevičiūtė ("Nereikalingi žmonės")Valda Bičkutė („Nereikalingi žmonės“,„Tikrovės pinklėse“, „Kolekcionierė“)

 Best supporting actor male 
Jonas Vaitkus ("Perlas")
Andrius Mamontovas ("Nereikalingi žmonės")Remigijus Sabulis ("Nuodėmės užkalbėjimas") Best male actor 
Kostas Smoriginas („Nereikalingi žmonės“„Nuodėmės užkalbėjimas“„Anastasija“)Marius Jampolskis („Kolekcionierė“,„Kai aš buvau partizanas“,„Moterys meluoja geriau“)Remigijus Vilkaitis („Mano tėvas“)

 Best female actor Rasa Samuolytė ("Nuodėmės užkalbėjimas")Nelė Savičenko ("Nuodėmės užkalbėjimas")Gabija Ryškuvienė („Kolekcionierė“, “Nereikalingi žmonės”)

 Best soundtrack
Kolekcionierė (Julius Zubavičius)Varpas (Viktoras Juzonis)'Nereikalingi žmonės (Jonas Maksvytis, Artūras Pugačiauskas, Andrius Mamontovas, Vytautas Žekonis)

 Special award 
"Auksinė gervė" (golden crane) of merits for Lithuanian cinema:
Donatas Banionis (actor)Marijonas Giedrys (director)Jonas Gircius (operator)''

External links 
Lithuanian Cinema Academy

Sidabrinė gervė
2008 in Lithuania
2008 film awards